Jennie Livingston (born February 24, 1962) is an American director best known for the 1990 documentary Paris is Burning.

Biography
Livingston was born in Dallas, Texas and grew up in Los Angeles, where her family moved when she was two years old. She is the youngest of three siblings, with two older brothers. Livingston attended Beverly Hills High School and graduated from Yale University in 1983, where she studied photography, drawing, and painting with a minor in English Literature. One of her teachers at Yale was the photographer Tod Papageorge. Livingston took a summer filmmaking class at New York University in 1984. She is the niece of the late film director Alan J. Pakula and worked in the art department on his 1987 film Orphans; he encouraged her to make her first film. Her mother was the poet, children's book author and anthologist Myra Cohn Livingston. Her father Richard Livingston was an accountant and author of the children's book The Hunkendunkens. Her brother Jonas was a music executive at Geffen Records and at MCA Records, and directed the video for Edie Brickell & New Bohemians' 1988 hit song What I Am. She has another brother called Joshua. Livingston moved to New York City in 1985, and was an activist with the AIDS activist group ACT UP. She is an out lesbian and lives in Brooklyn. She is Jewish.

Livingston's father died of heart disease in 1990, her mother and her grandmother both died of cancer within months of each other in 1996. Two years later, her uncle Alan J. Pakula died in a car accident, and Livingston's brother Jonas died suddenly in early 2000. The loss of her family and her experience of grief led her to start work on her film Earth Camp One.

Paris Is Burning

Livingston's documentary about a New York gay and transgender Black and Latin ball culture  won the 1991 Sundance Grand Jury Prize and was a key film both in the emerging American independent film movement and in the nascent New Queer Cinema. Paris is Burning was one of Miramax Films' earliest successes, and helped pave the way for a current crop of commercially successful documentary films. It was one of the best films of 1991 according to The Los Angeles Times, Time Magazine, The Washington Post, NPR and New York Magazine. In 2016, it was included in the Film Archive at the Library of Congress, along with 24 other films including The Birds, The Lion King, and East of Eden. When the film premiered it was positively reviewed by critics including Essex Hemphill, writing for The Guardian and Michelle Parkerson, writing for The Black Film Review. Favorable reviews appeared in The New Yorker, Time Magazine, The Village Voice, Newsweek, and elsewhere. Critical reviews came, most notably, from essayist bell hooks and film critic B. Ruby Rich.

The film has been a source of inspiration for filmmakers, television shows, LGBTQ communities, and queer activists. It's taught at universities in film, dance, cultural studies, and in multiple other academic disciplines. For Stonewall 40, the New York activist group FIERCE! screened the film on the New York piers where much of the film was shot. In 2018, Pratt Institute's Black Lives Matter student group kicked off their weekend of events with a screening of the film and discussion. The film inspired the creation of the FX show Pose, and its quotes and people and spirit infuse the show.

The main speakers in Paris is Burning include Octavia St Laurent, Carmen Xtravaganza, Brooke Xtravaganza, Willi Ninja, Dorian Corey, Junior Labeija, Venus Xtravaganza, Freddie Pendavis, Sol Pendavis, Kim Pendavis, and Pepper Labeija. The collaborative team that made Paris is Burning and that made it possible include executive producers Madison Davis Lacy and Nigel Finch, editor Jonathan Oppenheim, director of photography Paul Gibson, co-producer Barry Swimar, associate producer Claire Goodman, production manager Natalie Hill, and many others.

Initially released in 1991, the film continues to screen worldwide at festivals, universities, museums, and community groups, and attracts a multi-generational audience. In 2017, New York Times critic Wesley Morris included Paris is Burning in a piece for the Times' pullout children's section, "12 Films To See Before You Turn 13." Said Morris, "Jennie Livingston spent years observing competing enclaves of drag queens. Seeing her documentary as soon as possible means you can spend the rest of your life having its sense of humanity amuse, surprise, and devastate you, over and over."

Subsequent works

Two of Livingston's short films, Hotheads and Who's the Top?, explore queer topics. Hotheads, a 1993 documentary created through the AIDS research-friendly Red Hot Organization, explores two comedians' responses to violence against women: cartoonist Diane Dimassa, and writer/performer Reno. Hotheads was shown on MTV and KQED and released on Polygram Video as part of Red Hot's No Alternative compilation.

Who's the Top?, Livingston's first dramatic short film, premiered at Berlin International Film Festival in 2005, and stars Marin Hinkle, Shelly Mars, and Steve Buscemi. The film, a lesbian sex comedy with musical numbers, also features 24 Broadway dancers choreographed by Broadway choreographer John Carrafa. The film screened at more than 150 film festivals on nearly every continent, including theatrical runs at Boston's Museum of Fine Arts and London's Institute of Contemporary Arts.

Through the Ice is a digital short, commissioned in 2005 for public television station WNET-New York, about the accidental drowning of Miguel Flores in Prospect Park, Brooklyn and about the dog-walkers who tried to save him; the film was also seen at the 2006 Sundance Film Festival.

In 2011, Livingston set up a Kickstarter campaign to support her film project Earth Camp One. A non-fiction feature-length film, it is a memoir/essay about grief, loss, and a hippie summer camp in the 1970s, also a broader exploration of how Americans view loss and impermanence, including collective political loss, and queer identity in relation to loss. Livingston first started working on the project in 2000, wanting to explore the topics of loss and grief after having lost her father, mother, grandfather, uncle, and brother between 1990 and 2000. The film's status has been "post-production" on imdb.com since December 2014.

Livingston has also been developing , an ensemble episodic project set in the art worlds of New York and East Berlin in the late 1980s.

In 2011, Livingston directed a video for Elton John's show The Million Dollar Piano at Caesar's Palace in Las Vegas; the piece is a series of black and white moving-image portraits of a variety of New Yorkers that accompanies the song "Mona Lisas and Mad Hatters". The show ran for 7 years.

Livingston has taught and lectured worldwide, including teaching courses at Yale, Brooklyn College, and Connecticut College. Fellowships have included the Guggenheim Foundation, the Getty Center, the German Academic Exchange (DAAD), The MacDowell Colony, and the National Endowment for the Arts (NEA).

Since 2018, Livingston has been a consulting producer on the FX tv drama series Pose, which is "heavily inspired" by her documentary Paris Is Burning.

Filmography

Film
 1991: Paris Is Burning – director, producer
 1993: Hotheads – director, producer, editor (Short film)
 2005: Who's the Top? – director, producer, writer, editor (Short film)
 2006: Through the Ice – director, producer, editor (Short film)
 TBA: Earth Camp One – director, editor (in post-production)

Television
 2018–2019: Pose – consulting producer: seasons 1 and 2; director: episode "Blow" (2.07)

Theater
 1994: Stonewall – film installation in theatrical production

See also 
 LGBT culture in New York City
 List of female film and television directors
 List of lesbian filmmakers
 List of LGBT-related films directed by women
 List of LGBT people from New York City

References

External links

"Filmmaker Jennie Livingston On Life And Loss After 'Paris Is Burning'", BuzzFeed interview with Saeed Jones, March 23, 2013
Jennie Livingston official website
Indiewire interview
Manohla Dargis on Women Directors on Directing
"Legacy Award Winner Paris is Burning", Cinema Eye Honors
"NPR's 2019 Summer Movie Guide"

1962 births
Living people
American film directors
American women film directors
American women screenwriters
Beverly Hills High School alumni
Brooklyn College faculty
HIV/AIDS activists
Jewish American academics
Jewish American activists
American lesbian artists
LGBT film directors
American LGBT rights activists
LGBT Jews
LGBT people from Texas
MacDowell Colony fellows
People from Brooklyn
People from Los Angeles
Yale University alumni
21st-century American Jews
21st-century American women artists